Phaea mankinsi is a species of beetle in the family Cerambycidae. It was described by Chemsak and Linsley in 1979. It is known from Honduras and Guatemala.

References

mankinsi
Beetles described in 1979